Pellicano was the name of at least two ships of the Italian Navy and may refer to:

 , a torpedo boat launched in 1899 and discarded in 1920.
 , a  launched in 1943 and decommissioned in 1969.

Italian Navy ship names